The 2018–19 Divizia Națională de Seniori is the second premier Romanian rugby competition, reserved for club teams. The number of participating teams is decreased from initially twelve teams to just nine due to ACS Rugby Morometii Turnu Magurele, CS Manaştur and CS Sportul Studentesc București the three teams which had pulled out for financial reasons., with addition of the 2017-18 champions and runners-up of the second tier championship DNS-Divizia Nationala de Seniori. The eventual champions of the Divizia Națională de Seniori have the right to promote up to the SuperLiga with the relegating teams going down to Divizia A, Romania's 3rd level competition.

Teams

Group Centre-North

Group Centre-South

Tables
This is the regular season league table for Group Centre-North:

 

This is the regular season league table for Group Centre-South:

Fixtures & Results

Round 1

Round 2

Round 3

Round 4

Round 5

Round 6

Round 7

Round 8

Round 9

Round 10

Round 11

Round 12

Round 13

Round 14

Play-off Semifinals
The semi-finals were held on 18 May 2019 12:00 and 14:30 at Olimpia and Dan Păltinișanu respectively.

 Third/Fourth place final
Both finals were held on 25 May 2019, 1 week after the semi-finals at Stadionul Fepa 74.

 First / Second place final

Play-out Semifinals
The semi-finals were held on 18 May 2019 09:00 at Mihail Naca and Prinț Ghică respectively.

 Seventh/Eighth place final
Both finals were held on 26 May 2019, 1 week and 1 day after the semi-finals at Stadionul Olimpia.

 Fifth/Sixth place final

References

External links
  www.super-liga.ro  – Official website

2018–19 in European rugby union leagues
Rugby union leagues in Romania